Viscount Runciman of Doxford, of Doxford in the County of Northumberland, is a title in the Peerage of the United Kingdom. It was created in 1937 for the Hon. Walter Runciman, a politician whose career included service as a Member of Parliament, President of the Board of Trade and Lord President of the Council. He was the son and heir apparent of the shipping magnate and Liberal politician Walter Runciman, who had been created a Baronet in the Baronetage of the United Kingdom in 1906 and Baron Runciman, of Shoreston in the County of Northumberland, in 1933, also in the Peerage of the United Kingdom. As his father was still alive at the time of the creation of the viscountcy the title of this peerage was Runciman of Doxford rather than simply Runciman.  the titles are held by the first Viscount's great-grandson, the fourth Viscount, who succeeded his father in 2020. He is a well-known political scientist at the University of Cambridge.

Hilda Runciman, Viscountess Runciman of Doxford, wife of the first Viscount, represented St Ives, Cornwall in the House of Commons from 1928 to 1929. Also, the Hon. Sir Steven Runciman, younger son of the first Viscount and Hilda, Viscountess Runciman of Doxford, was a noted historian.

Barons Runciman (1933)
Walter Runciman, 1st Baron Runciman (1847–1937)
Walter Runciman, 2nd Baron Runciman (1870–1949) (had been created Viscount Runciman of Doxford in 1937)

Viscounts Runciman of Doxford (1937)
Walter Runciman, 1st Viscount Runciman of Doxford (1870–1949)
Walter Leslie Runciman, 2nd Viscount Runciman of Doxford (1900–1989)
Walter Garrison Runciman, 3rd Viscount Runciman of Doxford (1934–2020)
David Walter Runciman, 4th Viscount Runciman of Doxford (b. 1967)

The heir apparent is the present holder's son the Hon. Thomas Walter Runciman (b. 1999).

Notes

References
Kidd, Charles, Williamson, David (editors). Debrett's Peerage and Baronetage (1990 edition). New York: St Martin's Press, 1990, 
"Pride" Time 19 March 1928.

Viscountcies in the Peerage of the United Kingdom

Noble titles created in 1937
Noble titles created for UK MPs